Bartonella acomydis is a bacterium from the genus of Bartonella which was isolated from wild Rodentia.

References

External links
Type strain of Bartonella acomydis at BacDive -  the Bacterial Diversity Metadatabase

Bartonellaceae
Bacteria described in 2013